A commuter is an individual who regularly travels between home and work.

Commuter(s) or The Commuter(s) may also refer to:

Arts and entertainment
"The Commuter" (short story), a 1953 science fiction story by Philip K. Dick
"The Commuter" (Electric Dreams), a 2017 TV episode adaptation of the story
The Commuter (film), a 2018 thriller film starring Liam Neeson
The Commuters, a 1915 play by James Forbes
The Commuters, a 1915 silent film comedy, based on the play
Commuters, a 1988 film featuring Barbora Bobuľová
Commuter, performer of the song "Young Hearts" for the soundtrack of the 1984 film The Karate Kid

Transport
Commuter (Iarnród Éireann), a brand of suburban rail services in Ireland
Commuter Airlines, a defunct commuter airline based in Binghamton, New York
Commuter Cars, an American company that produced the prototype vehicle Commuter Cars Tango
Commuter Vehicles, a 1970s American company that produced the Citicar
KAI Commuter, a commuter rail services company in Jakarta, Indonesia
Tonggeun, translated on timetables as "Commuter", a class of train in South Korea
Toyota HiAce, a van known as Commuter in some countries

Other uses
Commuter Security Group, a Swedish security guard company